Big South Tournament may refer to the championship of any sport sponsored by the Big South Conference, including the following:

Big South Conference men's basketball tournament
Big South Conference men's soccer tournament
Big South Conference baseball tournament